Hanna Ralph (born Johanna Antonia Adelheid Günther; 25 September 1888 – 25 March 1978) was a German stage and film actress whose career began on the stage and in silent film in the 1910s and continued through the early 1950s.

Career
Hanna Ralph was born in Bad Kissingen, Germany, she made her stage debut in 1913 at the Schauspielhaus in Frankfurt. In 1917 she began working on various stages in Berlin.

Hanna Ralph made her screen debut in the 1917 Ludwig Beck-directed short Die entschleierte Maja, opposite actor Walter Janssen and the following year had a starring role in director Georg Jacoby's Keimendes Leben, Teil 1, opposite Emil Jannings. The film serial was followed by Keimendes Leben, Teil 2 in 1919. One of her most popular roles during her early years in films was that of the role of Katarina in Carl Froelich's 1921 film adaptation of Fyodor Dostoevsky's novel Die Brüder Karamasoff (The Brothers Karamazov), with actors Fritz Kortner and Bernhard Goetzke. In 1924 she appeared in the Herbert Wilcox-directed romantic drama Decameron Nights opposite American stage and screen actor Lionel Barrymore, and in Fritz Lang's silent fantasy film Die Nibelungen, based on the epic poem Nibelungenlied, as Brunhild. In 1926 she appeared in the internationally successful F.W. Murnau-directed, Universum Film AG (UFA) distributed Faust – Eine deutsche Volkssage opposite Gösta Ekman, Camilla Horn and husband Emil Jannings.

Hanna Ralph's career withstood the transition to sound film, however she appeared in only three films of the 1930s; instead, she spent much of the decade in theatre. By the Second World War she retired from acting. After the war's end, she briefly returned to film in the early 1950s; appearing in small roles in director Wolfgang Liebeneiner's 1951 crime drama The Blue Star of the South and Harald Reinl's 1952 drama Behind Monastery Walls before retiring from acting altogether.

Personal life
Hanna Ralph was married to the German actor Emil Jannings in 1919, however the marriage ended in divorce in 1921. She was later briefly married to director Fritz Wendhausen. She died in 1978 in West Berlin, West Germany at the age of 89.

Awards
In 1968 she was awarded the Bundesfilmpreis for her legacy as an actress in German cinema.

Partial filmography

 Die entschleierte Maja (1917) - Naela
 Ferdinand Lassalle (1918) - Gräfin Hatzfeld
 The Seeds of Life (1918-1919, part 1, 2) - Marietta Fraenkel, Fabrikbesitzer
 Tausend und eine Frau. Aus dem Tagebuch eines Junggesellen (1918)
 Das Geheimnis der Cecilienhütte (1918)
 Opium (1919) - Maria Geselius
 The Man of Action (1919) - Henrica van Looy
 Moral und Sinnlichkeit (1919) - Marietta Gerstner
 Prince Cuckoo (1919)
 Das große Licht (1920)
 Algol (1920) - Maria Obal
 The Brothers Karamazov (1920) - Katarina
 The Skull of Pharaoh's Daughter (1920)
 The Bull of Olivera (1921) - Donna Juana
 The Sins of the Mother (1921) - Harriet Kellogg - Schauspielerin
 Ein Fest auf Haderslevhuus (1921) - Wulfhild
 Oberst Rokschanin (1922)
 William Ratcliff (1922)
 Homo sum (1922)
 The Favourite of the Queen (1922) - Königin Elisabeth
 Helena (1924) - Andromache
 Die Nibelungen (1924) - Brunhild
 Decameron Nights (1924) - Lady Violante
 Muß die Frau Mutter werden? (1924) - Frau Derstner
 The Tower of Silence (1925) - Liane
 The Director General (1925) - Gerda
 Faust (1926) - Herzogin von Parma / Duchess of Parma
 Det sovende Hus (1926) - Elisabeth
 Das edle Blut (1927) - Thea von Lingen
 Restless Hearts (1928) - Dolores Heredia
 Napoleon at Saint Helena (1929) - Madame Bertrand
 The King of Paris (1930) - Duchess of Marsignac
 Der sündige Hof (1933) - Lona, seine Frau
 Martha (1936) - Königin von England
 The Blue Star of the South (1951) - Oberin Madeleine
 Behind Monastery Walls (1952) - Generaloberin (final film role)

References

External links

 

1888 births
1978 deaths
German stage actresses
German film actresses
German silent film actresses
People from Bad Kissingen
20th-century German actresses